Arnott may refer to:

Arnott (surname)
Arnott, Ontario, Canada
Arnott, Wisconsin, United States
Arnott (automobile), a car made by Arnott's Garages
Arnott's Biscuits, a subsidiary of the Campbell Soup Company of America
Arnott's Shapes, a savoury cracker produced by Arnott's
Arnotts (Ireland), a department store in Dublin
Arnotts (Scotland), a department store in Glasgow
Arnott baronets, a British baronetcy since 1896
Arnott Air Suspension Products, an aftermarket automobile parts company headquartered in the United States

See also
George Arnott Walker-Arnott (1799–1868), Scottish botanist
Robert Arnott Wilson (born 1958), group theorist
Arnot (disambiguation)